Frances Julia Stewart (born 4 August 1940) is professor emeritus of development economics and director of the Centre for Research on Inequality, Human Security and Ethnicity (CRISE), University of Oxford. A pre-eminent development economist, she was named one of fifty outstanding technological leaders for 2003 by Scientific American. She was president of the Human Development and Capability Association from 2008–2010.

Early life

Frances Stewart was born in Kendal on 4 August 1940, the daughter of Clarissa Goldschmidt, a history graduate from Somerville College, Oxford, and the economist Nicholas Kaldor. Her sister is the London School of Economics political scientist Mary Kaldor. The family moved to Cambridge in 1950.

She studied at Cambridgeshire High School for Girls and then gained a first-class degree from Oxford University in philosophy, politics and economics (PPE).

Selected bibliography

Books

Chapters in books

Journal articles

Papers 
  Pdf version.

Further reading
   (link to pdf)

References

External links
 Frances Stewart page at Oxford
 Centre for Research on Inequality, Human Security and Ethnicity (CRISE)
 Frances Stewart author page at Macmillan publishers
 HDCA website

Alumni of Somerville College, Oxford
1940 births
Living people
British Jews
British people of Hungarian-Jewish descent
British women economists
Daughters of life peers
British development economists
Fellows of Somerville College, Oxford
People from Kendal